"I'm Taking the Wheel" is a song written by Kristyn Osborn and John Shanks, and recorded by American country music group SHeDAISY.  It was released in November 2005 as the first single from their album Fortuneteller's Melody.  The song became their thirteenth chart entry on the Hot Country Songs charts, peaking at number 21 there.

Music video
The music video starts with the trio performing in front of an audience and shows Kristyn Osborn and her boyfriend (her then real-life boyfriend Aaron Eckhart) arguing in the car while driving on a road in the city trying to find their way. Throughout the video the trio continue to perform on stage while Kristyn and her boyfriend continue to argue. When Kristyn and her boyfriend decide to stop for gas, Kristyn decides to take the wheel while her boyfriend is pumping gas. From then on, her boyfriend slides into the passenger seat while Kristyn drives at high speeds through the city, making her boyfriend nervous. Toward the end of the video, Kristyn pulls the car over by sliding it into place, at this time the car overheats and her boyfriend is angry with her. Kristyn decides the best way to say she is sorry is by giving him a long kiss, which eventually ends up with him kissing her on the hood of the car. The trio finishes up their performance and the video fades out. The video was directed by Trey Fanjoy.

Chart performance

References

2005 singles
2005 songs
SHeDAISY songs
Music videos directed by Trey Fanjoy
Songs written by John Shanks
Lyric Street Records singles
Song recordings produced by John Shanks
Songs written by Kristyn Osborn